Jorge Barbosa de Lima (born 6 August 1979) is a Brazilian footballer who plays as a forward for Universidad in the Costa Rican Primera División.

Club career
Barbos became the foreigner to play for most different clubs in Costa Rica when he joined Cartaginés in 2009. In April 2010, he joined Águilas Guanacastecas from Cartaginés but ended up playing for Barrio México.

Herediano
La Flecha Barbosa was the third highest goal scorer in the 2011-12 CONCACAF Champions League. He rejoined them from the Guatemalan side Antigua in January 2013, but was released by the club in June 2013.

References

1979 births
Living people
Association football forwards
Brazilian footballers
Municipal Pérez Zeledón footballers
Santos de Guápiles footballers
Puntarenas F.C. players
C.S. Cartaginés players
Brujas FC players
C.S. Herediano footballers
C.F. Universidad de Costa Rica footballers
Brazilian expatriate footballers
Expatriate footballers in Costa Rica
Expatriate footballers in Guatemala
Antigua GFC players